is a railway station located in the city of Ichinoseki, Iwate Prefecture, Japan, operated by the East Japan Railway Company (JR East).

Lines
Senmaya Station is served by the Ōfunato Line, and is located 39.8 rail kilometers from the terminus of the line at Ichinoseki Station.

Station layout
The station has a single island platform connected to the station building by a level crossing. The station has a Midori no Madoguchi staffed ticket office.

Platforms

History
Senmaya Station opened on July 15, 1927. The station was absorbed into the JR East network upon the privatization of the Japan National Railways (JNR) on April 1, 1987.

Passenger statistics
In fiscal 2018, the  station was used by an average of 199 passengers daily (boarding passengers only).

Surrounding area
 
 
former Senmaya Town Hall
 Senmaya Post Office
Iwate Prefecture Senmaya High School

Senmaya Bus Terminal
Iwateken Kotsu
Ichinoseki-Ofunato Line・Ichinoseki-Kesennuma Line For Ichinoseki Station
Ichinoseki-Ofunato Line For Ofunato Station
Ichinoseki-Kesennuma Line For Sakari Station via Kesennuma Station
Kesennuma Linner For Kesennuma Station
Kesennuma Linner For Ikebukuro Station
Senmaya Morioka Line For Morioka Station
Hongo Line For Ichinoseki Station via Mataki Station
Ichinoseki Municipal Bus
Okutama Line For Nesan

Bus routes
Senmaya Station Bus stop
Iwateken Kotsu
Ichinoseki-Ofunato Line・Ichinoseki-Kesennuma Line For Ichinoseki Station
Ichinoseki-Ofunato Line For Ofunato Station
Ichinoseki-Kesennuma Line For Sakari Station via Kesennuma Station
Hongo Line For Ichinoseki Station via Mataki Station
Ichinoseki Municipal Bus
Fujisawa Line For Hanaizumi Station
Iwashimizu Line For Nakagami

See also
 List of Railway Stations in Japan

References

External links

  

Railway stations in Iwate Prefecture
Ōfunato Line
Railway stations in Japan opened in 1927
Ichinoseki, Iwate
Stations of East Japan Railway Company